Western value may refer to:
ethics in Western philosophy
political neologism, see European values

See also
Value (ethics)
Values (Western philosophy)
East–West dichotomy
History of Western civilization
Western culture